The Australian University (AU) (formerly known as the Australian College of Kuwait (ACK) is a private university located in Mubarak Al-Abdullah Al-Jaber Area, Kuwait which was established in 2004 as Kuwait's first private technical college. The university started as a vocational education college in Maritime. The Diploma program was started later in different areas, which was then expanded to cover a Bachelor of Technology program (based on a 2+2 model) in areas of Business and Engineering. The university also offers training program in Aviation. It was licensed by the Ministry of Education and Higher Education under Amiri Decree 141/2003 and commenced operation in October 2004.

2+2 model
The university operates on what is called a 2+2 model. Students initially enroll in a two-year full-time Diploma program after which they can choose to leave AU and commence employment or, if they have achieved the required GPA at the time of graduation with a Diploma, continue for a further two years of full-time study to complete a Bachelor's degree in Business or Engineering Technology.

Academic Programs and Units
AU consists of four different Academic/Training Units:
 College of Engineering: Offers Diploma and Degree Programs in Petroleum (Oil and Gas), Civil, Mechanical, and Electronics Engineering.
 College of Business: Offers Diploma and Degree Programs in Management and Marketing.
 School of Aviation: Offers a Diploma of Aircraft Maintenance Engineering (Mechanical). The program has been approved as a Part-147 Maintenance Training Organization, by the European Aviation Safety Agency (EASA), the Directorate General of Civil Aviation (DGCA) Kuwait and the General Civil Aviation Authority (GCAA), United Arab Emirates (UAE).
 English Language Program: Offers courses in English and Information Technology during the first preparatory year of students enrollment.

In addition, the university offers courses in Maritime Training through its specialized facilities.

Links

Universities and colleges in Kuwait
Educational institutions established in 2004
2004 establishments in Kuwait